Evros is one of the regional units of Greece. It is part of the region of East Macedonia and Thrace. Its name is derived from the river Evros, which appears to have been a Thracian hydronym. Evros is the northernmost regional unit. It borders Turkey to the east, across the river Evros, and it borders Bulgaria to the north and the northwest. 

Its capital is Alexandroupolis. Together with the regional units Rhodope and Xanthi, it forms the geographical region of Western Thrace. The population density was 34.77 per km2 (2011).

Geography

Evros is one of the largest regional units of Greece. It forms the eastern part of the geographical region Western Thrace, and includes the island Samothrace in the northern Aegean Sea. Its length is about 150 km from north to south (excluding Samothrace). Its width ranges from 70 to 100 km from east to west. The most important rivers are the Evros and its tributary Arda.

The Rhodope Mountains lie in the west and the southwest. The Aegean Sea lies to the south. The Evros valley is flat. Samothrace is mountainous.

The coastal area has a predominantly Mediterranean climate, whereas the northern part and the mountains have a colder continental climate.

Administration

The Evros regional unit is subdivided into 5 municipalities. These are (number as in the map in the infobox):
Alexandroupolis (1)
Didymoteicho (2)
Orestiada (3)
Samothrace (Samothraki, 4)
Soufli (5)

Prefecture

Evros was established as a prefecture in 1930, when the former Thrace Prefecture was divided into the Rhodope and Evros prefectures. As a part of the 2011 Kallikratis government reform, the prefecture was transformed into a regional unit within the East Macedonia and Thrace region, with no change in its boundaries. At the same time, the municipalities were reorganised, according to the table below.

Provinces

Province of Orestiada - Orestiada
Province of Didymoteicho - Didymoteicho
Province of Soufli - Soufli
Province of Alexandroupolis - Alexandroupolis
Province of Samothrace - Samothrace
Note: Provinces no longer hold any legal status in Greece.

History
As a part of Western Thrace, the territory of the Evros regional unit followed the fate of that region. In 1821, several parts of Evros region rebelled, such as Lavara and Samothraki, and participated in the Greek War of Independence. It became part of Greece in 1920 when it was ceded by Bulgaria as a result of the Treaty of Neuilly-sur-Seine. Initially it was part of the Thrace Prefecture, which was subdivided in 1930. 

During the Greco-Turkish War (1919-1922), many Greek refugees settled in the Evros. New towns were built, including Orestiada. The Evros river valley has flooded several times, with the most recent floods taking place in 2005, 2006, 2014 and in 2021 where the multiple and largest floods took place.

Transport

The main roads in the Evros regional unit are:
Egnatia Odos/E90 motorway (... Komotini - Alexandroupolis - İpsala (Turkey))
Greek National Road 2 (... Komotini - Alexandroupolis - Feres)
Greek National Road 51/E85 (Svilengrad (Bulgaria) - Orestiada - Didymoteicho - Feres)
Greek National Road 53 (Ormenio - Metaxades - Aisymi - Alexandroupolis)

A railway line connects Alexandroupolis with Thessaloniki via Komotini, Xanthi and Drama. Another line connects Alexandroupolis with Dimitrovgrad, Bulgaria via Didymoteicho and Orestiada, with a branch line from Didymoteicho to Uzunköprü, Turkey.

The Alexandroupolis International Airport is served by mostly national flights.

Sights 
The most important sights of the prefecture are:

 Church of Theotokos Kosmosoteira. The church was founded in 1152. It is considered one of the best examples of Byzantine art in Greece.
 Samothrace with the Sanctuary of the Great Gods and its Archaeological Museum.
 Evros Delta National Park
 Lighthouse of Alexandroupolis
 The post-Byzantine churches in the villages of Alepochori (Church of Saint Athanasius), Metaxades (Church of Saint Athanasius) and Paliouri (Church of Saint Pantaleon)
 The ancient Mesimvria-Zoni
 Dadia Forest
 Fossilized Forest of Lefkimmi
 Cyclops Polyphemus Cave in Makri
 Burial Tomb of Mikri Doxipara: Roman Tomb which dates from the 2nd century
 Didymoteicho
Byzantine Castle
 Çelebi Sultan Mehmed Mosque
 Hamam of Oruç Paşa
 Türbe of Oruç Pasha
 the Kayali Cave and the Vouva Cave
 Castle of Pythio
 The thermal baths of Traianoupoli
 Castle of Avanta-Potamos
 The Ethnological Museum of Thrace in Alexandroupolis
 The Silk Museum of Soufli
 Zourafa islet
 The village Metaxades with its traditional architecture
 The Pomak villages Goniko and Roussa with the traditional architecture

Notable people
Hrysopiyi Devetzi (1976, Alexandroupolis), Greek silver Olympic Champion in triple jump (Athens, 2004)
Demis Nikolaidis (1973, Alexandroupolis), Greek international footballer, European Champion with Greece National football team (Portugal, 2004)
Stelios Venetidis (1976, Orestiada),Greek international footballer, European Champion with Greece National football team (Portugal, 2004)
Athanasios Tsigas (1982, Aristeino Alexandroupolis), Greek footballer
Lefteris Hapsiadis (1953, Kila Feres), Greek lyricist and writer
Andreas Andreadis (1982, Provatonas Soufli), Greek international volleyball player
Marios Giourdas (1973, Alexandroupolis), international volleyball player
Thanassis Moustakidis (1962, Soufli), Greek international volleyball player, player with the most appearances with Greece  National football team
Nikos Samaras (1970-2013, Orestiada), Greek international volleyball player, player-symbol for the Greek volleyball
Constantin Carathéodory (1873-1950, Nea Vyssa), Greek mathematician
Dimosthenis Michalentzakis (1998, Feres), Greek Gold Paralympic Champion Swimmer in category S9 (Rio, 2016)
Marinos Ouzounidis (1968, Alexandroupolis), former international Greek footballer, now football coach
Manolis Siopis (1994, Alexandroupolis), Greek international footballer
Dimosthenis Magginas (1982, Alexandroupolis), Greek middle-distance, long-distance runner
Fotis Kosmas, (1926-1995), Alexandroupolis) Mediterranean and 7th Olympic winner in decathlon
Kostas Gatsioudis (1973, Didymoteicho), 6th Olympic winner, Mediterranean and Silver World champion, in Javelin throw
Nikos Alavantas (1959, Krios Orestiada), former Greek international footballer
Giannis Matzourakis (1949, Didymoteicho), former footballer, now football coach
Nikos Hadjinikolaou (1962, Alexandroupolis), Greek journalist
Renos Haralampidis (1970, Spilaio), Greek actor, film director
Yannis Stankoglou (1974, Thourio), Greek actor
John III Doukas Vatatzes (1192–1254, Didymoteicho), emperor of Nicaea
John V Palaiologos (1332–1391, Didymoteicho), Byzantine Emperor
Bayezid II (1481–1512, Didymoteicho) Sultan of the Ottoman Empire
Eugenios Eugenidis (1882–1954, Didymoteicho), shipping magnate
Sürmeli Ali Pasha, (1645-1695, Didymoteicho), Grand Vizier of the Ottoman Empire
Konstantinos Malamatinas, founder of retsina Malamatina
Paraskevas Tselios (1997, Alexandroupolis), Greek international volleyball player with Greece men's national volleyball team
Savvas Gentsoglou (1990, Alexandroupolis), Greek football player
Gregoris Mentzas (1960, Alexandroupolis), Greek management scientist and professor at the National Technical University of Athens
Giorgos Valavanidis (1974, Alexandroupolis), Greek; former international basketball player, silver medalist with Greece women's national under-16 basketball team in 1991 and Greek champion with PAOK
Arete Kosmidou (1997, Alexandroupolis), Greek singer
Anestis Dalakouras (1993, Alexandroupolis), international Volleyball player with Greece men's national volleyball team
Stavros Stathakis (1987, Alexandroupolis), Greece footballer
Nikos Alavantas (1959, Orestiada), former international footballer with Greece national football team
Stefania Liberakaki (2002), Greek-Dutch singer originally from Sofiko, a village near Didymoteicho

References

External links
Evros terrain map by Geopsis

 
Prefectures of Greece
1920 establishments in Greece
Regional units of Eastern Macedonia and Thrace